Neil Aggett (6 October 1953 – 5 February 1982) was a doctor and trade union organiser who was killed, while in detention, by the Security Branch of the Apartheid South African Police Service after being held for 70 days without trial.

Life and death 

Aggett was born in Nanyuki, Kenya, and his family moved to South Africa in 1964, where he attended Kingswood College (South Africa) in Grahamstown from 1964 to 1970, and later the University of Cape Town, where he completed a medical degree in 1976.

Aggett worked as a physician in Black hospitals (under apartheid hospitals were segregated) in Umtata, Tembisa and later at Baragwanath hospital in Soweto, working in Casualty and learning to speak in basic Zulu. He was appointed an unpaid organiser of the Transvaal Food and Canning Workers' Union, and helped to organise the workers at Fatti’s and Moni’s in Isando, at a critical time when the company faced a growing boycott campaign for having unfairly dismissed workers at its factory in Bellville, Western Cape. He worked as a doctor on Wednesday nights and Friday nights so he could continue with his union work.

Following a historic gathering in Langa near Cape Town, in August 1981, of unions that had previously been fiercely divided, he was entrusted with building a Transvaal Solidarity Committee.

Aggett was unjustly detained with his partner Dr Elizabeth Floyd by the Apartheid security police on 27 November 1981. His death on 5 February 1982, after 70 days of detention without trial, marked the 51st death in detention. He was 28 years old. He was the first white person to die in detention since 1963. According to the Apartheid South African Security Police, Aggett allegedly committed suicide by hanging himself while being held at the John Vorster Square police station. 

About 15,000 mourners attended Aggett's funeral on 13 February 1982, including Bishop Desmond Tutu. Previously divided unions called for a joint stay-away two days before the funeral, to which about 90,000 workers from across the country responded. Aggett is buried in the Westpark Cemetery in Johannesburg.

The inquest into his death lasted 44 days. The Aggett team of lawyers, led by anti-Apartheid activist and senior legal counsel George Bizos with Denis Kuny as his junior, used 'similar fact' evidence and argued 'induced suicide'. For the first time in a South African court of law, former detainees gave evidence of torture. Aggett made an affidavit 14 hours before his death that he had been assaulted, blindfolded and given electric shocks. However, Magistrate Kotze ruled that the death was not brought about by any act or omission on the part of the Apartheid police.

Some five years after his death, at the 1987 conference of the Five Freedoms Forum, fellow detainee Frank Chikane recalled how he had seen Aggett in jail returning from one of his interrogations, being half carried, half dragged by warders; Chikane saw this as a sign of how badly injured Aggett was at the time.

Johnny Clegg included a tribute to Aggett in his song, Asimbonanga (Mandela) on the Third World Child album (1987). Clegg also wrote the song "Siyayilanda" on the Scatterlings album (1982) for Aggett. George Bizos includes a chapter on the Aggett inquest in the book No One to Blame?: In Pursuit of Justice in South Africa. Donald McRae reveals how Aggett's death in detention deeply affected himself and his family in his memoir Under Our Skin 'Death of an Idealist: In Search of Neil Aggett' is a full referenced biography by Beverley Naidoo, with a Foreword by George Bizos SC.

The South African Medical Association, a non-statutory, professional association for public- and private-sector medical practitioners in South Africa never recognized the tireless deeds for the underprivileged by Dr. Neil Aggett and subsequent torture leading to his death at John Vorster Prison, Johannesburg.

The High Court in Johannesburg re-opened an inquest into Aggett's death on Monday, 20 January 2020, 38 years after his death by alleged suicide. Jill Burger, Aggett's sister, told the High Court during the Johannesburg inquest that her brother was killed when the torture went too far.

Final Judgement

On 4 March 2022 Judge Motsamai Makume overturned the findings of the 1982 inquest in his ruling in the Johannesburg High Court. After a thorough inquiry based on factual evidence and depositions of former members of the Security Branch and fellow detainees, the court ruled that Dr. Neil Aggett did not die by suicide but was killed by members of the Apartheid Security Branch in the early hours of the morning on 5 February 1982. This sets in motion avenues for the National Prosecuting Authority to prosecute those Security Branch Police officers responsible for his death and the cover up which followed. Judge Makume referred to Judge Kotze's findings in the original inquest as 'a serious error in judgment' and his conclusions as 'mind-blowingly weak'.

Medical Journal Article 

The inquest on 4th March 2022 found that Dr. Aggett didn’t die of hanging but due to Crush Syndrome caused by beatings and forcible exercise at the John Vorster Prison, Johannesburg. The details were published in the Journal of Medicine and Public Health, Chicago IL 60659, USA

Neil Aggett Memorial Lecture
The Annual Neil Aggett Memorial Lecture is held at Kingswood College, Grahamstown. Aggett attended Kingswood College from 1964-1970.The lecture focuses on memories of Neil Aggett and looks at the concept of injustice and what injustice is, and how we, as a society, face more injustices than ever before. Dr Amitabh Mitra, was a special guest at the year 2019 lecture as he presented the school with a charcoal drawing that he drew of Neil Aggett. This drawing is one very few visual representations of Aggett and will be displayed in the Kingswood College Museum. , Grahamstown

Honours 
The Neil Aggett Labour Studies Unit (NALSU) at Rhodes University is named in honour of Aggett.

Notes and references

External links 

 Short bio (SA History website)
 Kingswood College, Aggett's old School, honours his life (newspaper article)
 Details of the Neil Aggett papers held at the library of the University of Cape Town
 Complete record of the inquest  (Historical Papers, The Library, University of the Witwatersrand, Johannesburg: AK2216, 1982.)
 Neil Aggett's boyhood in Kenya is an imagined point of reference for the novel Burn My Heart (Puffin, 2007) by Beverley Naidoo, his second cousin

1953 births
1982 deaths
People from Laikipia County
Kenyan people of English descent
Kenyan emigrants to South Africa
Deaths in police custody in South Africa
South African people who died in prison custody
Prisoners who died in South African detention
University of Cape Town alumni
Victims of police brutality
South African activists
South African trade unionists
South African communists
South African people of English descent
White Kenyan people
Alumni of Kingswood College (South Africa)